This is a list of Sites of Community Importance in Andalusia.

See also 
 List of Sites of Community Importance in Spain

References 
 Lisf of sites of community importance in Andalusia

Andalusia